This is a list of women writers who were born in Panama or whose writings are closely associated with that country.

A
Elsie Alvarado de Ricord (1928–2005), poet, essayist, biographer, linguist
Patricia Alvarado Nuñez (born 1967), Panamanian-American television presenter, documentary screenwriter, photographer, journalist

B
Rosa María Britton (1936–2019), novelist, playwright

D
Amelia Denis de Icaza (1836–1911), romantic poet, the first Panamanian woman to publish her poetry

G
Nicole Garay (1873–1928), poet
Aida González (born 1962), short story writer, medical doctor
Gloria Guardia (1940–2019), novelist, essayist, short story writer, critic, journalist

H
Ofelia Hooper (1900–1981), sociologist, poet, non-fiction writer, civil rights activist

L
Olga F. Linares (1936–2014), Panamanian-American anthropologist, non-fiction writer

M
Annabel Miguelena (born 1984), novelist, short story writer, actress

O
María Olimpia de Obaldía (1891–1985), poet

R
 Susana Richa de Torrijos (born 1924), educator, essayist, politician

S
Stella Sierra (1917–1997), poet, educator

T
Consuelo Tomás (born 1957), puppeteer, playwright, poet, novelist
Reina Torres de Araúz (1932–1982), anthropologist, ethnographer, and professor

See also
List of women writers
List of Spanish-language authors

References

-
Panamanian
Writers
Writers, women